Busby is a census-designated place (CDP) in Big Horn County, Montana, United States. It is on the Northern Cheyenne reservation. The population was 745 at the 2010 census.

Description

The town is named for postmaster Sheridan Busby. The post office was established in 1904.

Trader W. P. Moncure erected the Two Moons Monument at Busby in 1936.

Geography
The community is located on Rosebud Creek and U.S. Route 212.

It is on the Northern Cheyenne Indian Reservation. Belle Highwalking was taught by her uncle at Busby School in the early 1900s.

Demographics

As of the census of 2000, there were 695 people, 177 households, and 147 families residing in the CDP. The population density was 49.0 people per square mile (18.9/km2). There were 201 housing units at an average density of 14.2 per square mile (5.5/km2). The racial makeup of the CDP was 6.33% White, 89.50% Native American, 0.14% from other races, and 4.03% from two or more races. Hispanic or Latino of any race were 3.31% of the population.

There were 177 households, out of which 54.2% had children under the age of 18 living with them, 54.2% were married couples living together, 22.0% had a female householder with no husband present, and 16.4% were non-families. 14.7% of all households were made up of individuals, and 5.6% had someone living alone who was 65 years of age or older. The average household size was 3.93 and the average family size was 4.34.

In the CDP, the population was spread out, with 46.2% under the age of 18, 7.3% from 18 to 24, 25.5% from 25 to 44, 16.4% from 45 to 64, and 4.6% who were 65 years of age or older. The median age was 21 years. For every 100 females there were 99.1 males. For every 100 females age 18 and over, there were 94.8 males.

The median income for a household in the CDP was $28,750, and the median income for a family was $30,625. Males had a median income of $25,208 versus $25,250 for females. The per capita income for the CDP was $8,383. About 30.2% of families and 35.8% of the population were below the poverty line, including 41.4% of those under age 18 and 32.4% of those age 65 or over.

Climate
According to the Köppen Climate Classification system, Busby has a semi-arid climate, abbreviated "BSk" on climate maps.

Education
Northern Cheyenne Tribal Schools educate students from kindergarten through 12th grade. Northern Cheyenne High School's team name is the Eagles.

The traditional public school districts serving the area include Lodge Grass Elementary School District and Lame Deer High School District.

Notable person
 General George Crook led troops through this area to the Battle of the Rosebud in 1876

See also

 List of census-designated places in Montana

References

External links

 Rosebud Battle Field State Park

Census-designated places in Big Horn County, Montana